Phytoecia varentzovi is a species of beetle in the family Cerambycidae. It was described by Semenov in 1896.

References

Phytoecia
Beetles described in 1896